Finger Prints is a 1927 American silent comedy crime film directed by Lloyd Bacon and starring Louise Fazenda, John T. Murray, and Helene Costello.

Cast

Preservation
No prints of Finger Prints survive, making it a lost film.

References

External links
 

1927 films
1920s English-language films
American silent feature films
Films directed by Lloyd Bacon
Lost American films
Lost crime comedy films
Warner Bros. films
American black-and-white films
American crime comedy films
1920s crime comedy films
1927 comedy films
1927 lost films
1920s American films
Silent American comedy films
Silent crime comedy films